Restless Hearts is a 1928 German-Spanish silent film directed by Benito Perojo and Gustav Ucicky and starring Betty Bird, Hanna Ralph and Livio Pavanelli.

The film was a co-production between a Spanish company and the German studio Bavaria Film. The Argentine actress Imperio Argentina was cast after winning a competition staged by the film's producers. The film was based on a novel by Pedro Mata. Art direction was by Ludwig Reiber.

On its release the film was attacked by Spanish critics who felt that the Spanish actors had been relegated to lesser roles.

Cast
Betty Bird as Maria Luise
Hanna Ralph as Dolores Heredia
Livio Pavanelli as Alfonso
Imperio Argentina as Isabel
Valentín Parera as Alcaraz
Walter Grüters as Mac Stone
M. W. Lenz as musician #1
Franz Loskarn as musician #2
Ferdinand Martini as 3musician #3
Alfredo Hurtado
Emilio Mesejo
Iván Petrovich

References

External links

Films of the Weimar Republic
German silent feature films
Spanish silent films
Films directed by Benito Perojo
Films directed by Gustav Ucicky
Bavaria Film films
German black-and-white films
Films based on Spanish novels
1920s German films